William E. Crow (1870–1922) was a U.S. Senator from Pennsylvania from 1921 to 1922. Senator Crow may also refer to:

Herman D. Crow (1851–1915), Washington State Senate
Herschal Crow (1935–2015), Oklahoma State Senate
L. C. Crow (1851–1938), Washington State Senate
Wayman Crow (1808–1885), Missouri State Senate
A. G. Crowe (born 1948), Louisiana State Senate
Rachelle Crowe (born 1972/1973), Illinois State Senate
Rusty Crowe (born 1947), Tennessee State Senate